Austroterpna is a genus of moths in the family Geometridae.

Species
 Austroterpna idiographa Goldfinch, 1929
 Austroterpna paratorna (Meyrick, 1888)

References
 Austroterpna at Markku Savela's Lepidoptera and Some Other Life Forms

Pseudoterpnini
Geometridae genera